The 2nd constituency of the Landes (French: Deuxième circonscription des Landes) is a French legislative constituency in the Landes département. Like the other 576 French constituencies, it elects one MP using the two-round system, with a run-off if no candidate receives over 50% of the vote in the first round.

Description

The 2nd constituency of the Landes lies in the south of the department bordering the Atlantic Ocean to the west and Pyrénées-Atlantiques to the south. As well as a long stretch of coastline the seat also includes the spa town and Subprefecture Dax.

Politically the constituency has traditionally supported the Socialist Party (France) with the exceptions of the 1993 and 2017 elections.

Assembly Members

Election results

2022

 
 
 
 
 
 
 
|-
| colspan="8" bgcolor="#E9E9E9"|
|-

2017

2012

References

2